The Franks, Germanic-speaking peoples that invaded the Western Roman Empire in the 5th century, were first led by individuals called dukes and reguli. The earliest group of Franks that rose to prominence was the Salian Merovingians, who conquered most of Roman Gaul, as well as the Gaulish territory of the Visigothic Kingdom, in 507 AD. 

The sons of Clovis I, the first King of the Franks, conquered the Burgundian and the Alamanni Kingdoms. They acquired a province, called Provence, and went on to make the peoples of the Bavarii and Thuringii their clients. The Merovingians were later replaced by the new Carolingian dynasty in the 8th century. By the late 9th century, the Carolingians themselves had been replaced throughout much of their realm by other dynasties.

A timeline of Frankish rulers has been difficult to trace since the realm, according to old Germanic practice, was frequently divided among the sons of a leader upon the leader's death. However, territories were eventually reunited through marriage, treaty or conquest. There were often multiple Frankish kings who ruled different territories, and divisions of the territories were not very consistent over time. 

As inheritance traditions changed over time, the divisions of Francia (the lands of the Franks) started to become kingdoms that were more permanent. West Francia formed the heart of what was to become the Kingdom of France; East Francia evolved into the Kingdom of Germany; and Middle Francia become the Kingdom of Lotharingia in the north, the Kingdom of Italy in the south, and the Kingdom of Provence in the west. West and East Francia soon divided up the area of Middle Francia, and Germany lost Carolingian control in 911 with the election of Conrad I as king.

The idea of a "King of the Franks" (or Rex Francorum) gradually disappeared during the 11th and 12th centuries. The title "King of the Franks" continued to be used in the Kingdom of France until 1190. The Kingdom of the Franks had long been extinct, but the title "Queen consort of the Franks" continued to be used until 1227. That represented a shift in thinking about the monarchy from that of a popular monarchy, the leader of a people, sometimes without a defined territory to rule, to that of a monarchy tied to a specific territory.

King of the Franks (509–511)

Merovingian dynasty

Clovis I united all the Frankish petty kingdoms as well as most of Roman Gaul under his rule, conquering the Domain of Soissons of the Roman general Syagrius as well as the Visigothic Kingdom of Toulouse. He took his seat at Paris, which along with Soissons, Reims, Metz, and Orléans became the chief residences. Upon his death, the kingdom was split among his four sons.

Kings of the Neustrian Franks (511–679)

Merovingian dynasty

Kings of the Austrasian Franks (511–679)

Merovingian dynasty
Chlothar II defeated Brunhilda and her grandson, reunifying the kingdom. However, in 623, to appease the local nobility and also secure the borders, he gave the Austrasians his young son as their own king. His son and successor, Dagobert I, emulated this move by appointing a sub-king for Aquitaine, with a seat at Toulouse, in 629 and Austrasia in 634.

Kings of the Franks (679–840)

Merovingian dynasty
Theuderic III was recognized as king of all the Franks in 679. From then on, the kingdom of the Franks can be treated as a unit again for all but a very brief period of civil war. This is the period of the roi fainéant, "do-nothing kings" who were increasingly overshadowed by their mayors of the palace.

Carolingian dynasty

The Carolingians were initially mayors of the palace under the Merovingian kings, first in Austrasia and later in Neustria and Burgundy. In 687 Pepin of Heristal took the title Duke and Prince of the Franks (dux et princeps Francorum) after his conquest of Neustria in at the Battle of Tertry, which was cited by contemporary chroniclers as the beginning of Pepin's reign. Between 715 and 716, the descendants of Pepin disputed the succession.

Finally, in 747 Pepin the Short became Mayor of the Palace of Austrasia in addition to that of Neustria, making him defacto ruler of the Frankish kingdom. He arranged for the deposition of the Merovingian king Childeric III and in March 752, Pepin was himself anointed King of the Franks. The office of Mayor was absorbed into the Crown, and this marked the start of the Carolingians as the ruling dynasty.

Louis the Pious made many divisions of his empire during his lifetime. The final division, pronounced at Worms in 838, made Charles the Bald heir to the west, including Aquitaine, and Lothair heir to the east, including Italy and excluding Bavaria, which was left for Louis the German. However, following the emperor's death in 840, the empire was plunged into a civil war that lasted three years. The Frankish kingdom was then divided by the Treaty of Verdun in 843. Lothair was allowed to keep his imperial title and his kingdom of Italy, and granted the newly created Kingdom of Middle Francia, a corridor of land stretching from Italy to the North Sea, and including the Low Countries, the Rhineland (including Aachen), Burgundy, and Provence. Charles was confirmed in Aquitaine, where Pepin I's son Pepin II was opposing him, and granted West Francia (modern France), the lands west of Lothair's Kingdom. Louis the German was confirmed in Bavaria and granted East Francia (modern Germany), the lands east of Lothair's kingdom.

The following table does not provide a complete listing for some of the various regna of the empire, especially those who were subregna of the Western, Middle, or Eastern kingdom such as Italy, Provence, Neustria, and Aquitaine.

References

Sources

Further reading 

The history of France as recounted in the "Grandes Chroniques de France", and particularly in the personal copy produced for King Charles V between 1370 and 1380 that is the saga of the three great dynasties, the Merovingians, Carolingians, and the Capetians, that shaped the institutions and the frontiers of the realm. This document was produced and likely commissioned during the Hundred Years' War, a dynastic struggle between the rulers of France and England with rival claims to the French throne. It should therefore be read and considered carefully as a source, due to the inherent bias in the context of its origins.
The Cambridge Illustrated History of France – Cambridge University Press
The Origins of France: Clovis to the Capetians 500–1000 by Edward James 
Late Merovingian France: History and Hagiography, 640–720 (Manchester Medieval Sources); Paul Fouracre (Editor), Richard A. Gerberding (Editor) 
Medieval France: An Encyclopedia, eds. W. Kibler and G. Zinn. New York: Garland Publishing, 1995.

External links 
 

Franks